The 1961 Giro d'Italia was the 44th running of the Giro d'Italia, one of cycling's Grand Tour races. The Giro started in Turin, on 20 May, with a  stage and concluded in Milan, on 11 June, with a  leg. A total of 170 riders from 17 teams entered the 21-stage race, which was won by Italian Arnaldo Pambianco of the  team. The second and third places were taken by Frenchman Jacques Anquetil and Spaniard Antonio Suárez, respectively.

Teams

A total of 17 teams were invited to participate in the 1961 Giro d'Italia. Each team sent a squad of ten riders, so the Giro began with a peloton of 170 cyclists. Out of the 170 riders that started this edition of the Giro d'Italia, a total of 92 riders made it to the finish in Milan. Legnano initially threatened to not participate in the Giro.

The 17 teams that took part in the race were:

Pre-race favorites

There was initial belief that Charly Gaul would not race the Giro.

Route and stages

The route was revealed on 22 April 1961.

Classification leadership

One jersey was worn during the 1961 Giro d'Italia. The leader of the general classification – calculated by adding the stage finish times of each rider – wore a pink jersey. This classification is the most important of the race, and its winner is considered as the winner of the Giro.

The mountains classification leader. The climbs were ranked in first and second categories. In this ranking, points were won by reaching the summit of a climb ahead of other cyclists. There were three categories of mountains. The first category awarded 50, 40, 30, 20, and 10 points, the second distributed 40, 30, 20, and 10 points, and the third category gave 30, 20, and 10 points. Although no jersey was awarded, there was also one classification for the teams, in which the teams were awarded points for their rider's performance during the stages.

Final standings

General classification

Mountains classification

Team classification

References

Citations

 
1961
Giro d'Italia
Giro d'Italia
Giro d'Italia
Giro d'Italia
1961 Super Prestige Pernod